The 29th Regiment Illinois Volunteer Infantry was an infantry regiment that

served in the Union Army during the American Civil War.

Service
The 29th Illinois Infantry was organized at Camp Butler, Illinois and mustered into Federal service on August 15, 1861.

The regiment was mustered out on November 6, 1865.

Total strength and casualties
The regiment suffered 5 officers and 70 enlisted men who were killed in action or who died of their wounds and 3 officers and 222 enlisted men who died of disease, for a total of 300 fatalities.

Commanders
Colonel James S. Rearden
Colonel Mason Brayman
Colonel Charles M. Ferrill
Colonel Loren Kent - Mustered out with the regiment.

See also
List of Illinois Civil War Units
Illinois in the American Civil War

Notes

References
The Civil War Archive
29th Illinois Infantry in the American Civil War
29th Illinois Infantry
The Civil War-Battle Unit Details-29th Regiment, Illinois Infantry

Further reading
Bolerjack, William S. Civil War Diaries, 1861-1863. Carbondale, [Ill.]: Southern Illinois University Morris Library, 1900. 

Units and formations of the Union Army from Illinois
1861 establishments in Illinois
Military units and formations established in 1861
Military units and formations disestablished in 1865